Valle Agricola is a comune (municipality) in the Province of Caserta in the Italian region Campania, located about  north of Naples and about  north of Caserta.

Valle Agricola borders the following municipalities: Letino, Prata Sannita, Raviscanina, San Gregorio Matese, Sant'Angelo d'Alife.

References

Cities and towns in Campania